Phlebia is a genus of mostly crust fungi in the family Meruliaceae. The genus has a widespread distribution. Phlebia species cause white rot.

Taxonomy
Phlebia was circumscribed by Swedish mycologist Elias Fries in his 1821 work Systema Mycologicum. He included four species: P. merismoides, P. radiata, P. contorta, and P. vaga.

Several molecular studies have demonstrated that Phlebia is a collection of sometimes unrelated taxa that share some morphological similarities. In a 2015 study, Floudas and Hibbett identified a "core Phlebia clade" within the larger Phlebioid clade, containing P. radiata, P. acerina, P. floridensis, P. setulosa, P. brevispora, and P. tremellosa. A subsequent study suggested that P. lindtneri, P. serialis and P. leptospermi should be added to this core group.

Phlebia-like fungi with aculei (spines) are often included in the genera Mycoacia if they are monomitic, and Mycoaciella if they are dimitic or trimitic.

Species

, Index Fungorum accepts 89 species of Phlebia:
P. anthocystis Gilb. & Nakasone (1998) – Hawaii
P. acerina Peck (1889)
P. alni Velen. (1922)
P. amylostratosa Svrček (1973)
P. ardesiaca Parmasto (1967)
P. argentea Parmasto (1967)
P. argentina (Speg.) Rajchenb. & J.E.Wright (1987)
P. argentinensis W.B.Cooke (1956)
P. brevibasidia G.Kaur, Avn.P. Singh & Dhingra (2017) – Punjab, India
P. brevispora Nakasone (1981)
P. brunneofusca (Hjortstam & Ryvarden) Nakasone & Gilb. (1998)
P. canadensis W.B.Cooke (1956)
P. capitata Bernicchia & Gorjón (2010)
P. caspica Hallenb. (1980)
P. castanea Lloyd (1922)
P. celtidis W.B.Cooke (1956)
P. centrifuga P.Karst. (1881)
P. cinnamomea Rick (1960)
P. citrea (Pat.) Nakasone (2003)
P. coccineofulva Schwein. (1832)
P. columellifera (G.Cunn.) Duhem (2009)
P. crassisubiculata Avn.P. Singh, Priyanka, Dhingra & Singla (2010) – Himachal Pradesh, India
P. cristata Velen. (1922)
P. cystidiata H.S.Jacks. ex W.B.Cooke (1956)
P. diaphana Parmasto ex K.H.Larss. & Hjortstam (1986)
P. dictyophoroides Sang H.Lin & Z.C.Chen (1990)
P. diffissa J.Erikss. & Hjortstam (1981)
P. donkii Bourdot (1930)
P. epithelioides P.Roberts (2000) – Cameroon
P. faviformis W.B.Cooke (1958)
P. femsjoeensis (Litsch. & S.Lundell) J.Erikss. & Hjortstam (1981)
P. firma J.Erikss. & Hjortstam (1981)
P. flavocrocea (Bres.) Donk (1957)
P. floridensis Nakasone & Burds. (1995) – United States
P. formosana Sheng H.Wu (1990) – Taiwan
P. fragilis (G.Cunn.) Gorjón & Gresl. (2012)
P. gilbertsonii Nakasone (1997)
P. griseoflavescens (Litsch.) J.Erikss. & Hjortstam (1981) – Europe
P. griseolivens (Bourdot & Galzin) Parmasto (1967)
P. hydnoidea Schwein. (1832)
P. icterina P.Roberts (2000) – Cameroon
P. introversa (Rehill & B.K.Bakshi) Hjortstam (1995)
P. jurassica Duhem & M.Duenas (2013) – Europe
P. lacteola (Bourdot) M.P.Christ. (1960) – Great Britain
P. leptospermi (G.Cunn.) Stalpers (1985) – Western Australia
P. lilascens (Bourdot) J.Erikss. & Hjortstam (1981) – Europe
P. livida (Pers.) Bres. (1897) – Africa; Europe; North America
P. lividina Hjortstam (1995) – South Carolina, USA
P. ludoviciana (Burt) Nakasone & Burds. (1982)
P. margaritae Duhem & H.Michel (2007)
P. merulioides Lloyd (1915)
P. moelleriana Henn. (1897)
P. murrillii W.B.Cooke (1956)
P. nantahaliensis Nakasone & Burds. (1995)
P. nitidula (P.Karst.) Ryvarden (1971)
P. pallidolivens (Bourdot & Galzin) Parmasto (1967)
P. parva Ghob.-Nejh. (2012)
P. patriciae Gilb. & Hemmes (2004) – Hawaii
P. pellucida Hjortstam & Ryvarden (1988) – China
P. phlebioides (H.S.Jacks. & Dearden) Donk (1957)
P. plumbea Parmasto (1967)
P. pulcherrima Parmasto (1967)
P. pyrenaica Duhem (2009)
P. radiata Fr. (1821)
P. rhodana Duhem & B.Rivoire (2014)
P. rufa (Pers.) M.P.Christ. (1960) – Europe; Jamaica
P. ryvardenii Hallenb. & Hjortstam (1988)
P. sedimenticola (S.Ahmad) S.Ahmad (1972)
P. segregata (Bourdot & Galzin) Parmasto (1967) – Europe
P. separata (H.S.Jacks. & Dearden) Parmasto (1967)
P. serialis (Fr.) Donk (1957) – Sweden
P. sordida Rick (1938) – South America
P. subceracea (Wakef.) Nakasone (2003) – Australia
P. subconspersa (Rick) Baltazar & Rajchenb. (2016)
P. subfascicularis (Wakef.) Nakasone & Gilb. (1998) – Australia
P. sublilascens (Litsch.) Parmasto (1967)
P. sublivida Parmasto (1967)
P. subochracea (Alb. & Schwein.) J.Erikss. & Ryvarden (1976) – Europe
P. subserialis (Bourdot & Galzin) Donk (1957) – Europe
P. subulata J.Erikss. & Hjortstam (1981)
P. totara (G.Cunn.) Stalpers & P.K.Buchanan (1991)
P. tremellosa (Schrad.) Nakasone & Burds. (1984)
P. tuberculata (Berk. & M.A.Curtis) Ţura, Zmitr., Wasser & Spirin (2011)
P. unica (H.S.Jacks. & Dearden) Ginns (1984)
P. verruculosa Hjortstam & Ryvarden (1980)
P. vinosa (Overh.) Burds. (1990)
P. viridesalebrosa J.Erikss. & Hjortstam (1981) – Europe
P. weldeniana Nakasone & Burds. (1995)
P. wrightii (Berk. & M.A.Curtis) Duhem (2010)

References

Meruliaceae
Polyporales genera
Taxa described in 1821
Taxa named by Elias Magnus Fries